The 2007 Korean FA Cup Final was a football match played on 25 November 2007 and 2 December 2007 that decided the winner of the 2007 season of the Korean FA Cup. The 2007 final was the culmination of the 12th season of the tournament.

The final was contested by Chunnam Dragons and Pohang Steelers. Both matches kicked off at 15:00 KST. The referee for the first and second match was Lee Young-Chul and Kwon Jong-Chul, respectively.

Road to the final

Chunnam Dragons

1Chunnam's goals always recorded first.

Pohang Steelers

1Pohang's goals always recorded first.

Match details

First leg

Second leg

See also
2007 Korean FA Cup

References

2007
FA
Korean FA Cup Final 2007
Korean FA Cup Final 2007